Alfonso Pandolfi or Alphonse Pandolfi (died 1648) was a Roman Catholic prelate who served as Bishop of Comacchio (1631–1648).

Biography
On 12 May 1631, Alfonso Pandolfi was appointed during the papacy of Pope Urban VIII as Bishop of Comacchio.
On 18 May 1631, he was consecrated bishop by Carlo Emmanuele Pio di Savoia, Cardinal-Bishop of Porto e Santa Rufina, with Erasmo Paravicini, Bishop of Alessandria della Paglia, and Angelo Cesi, Bishop of Rimini, serving as co-consecrators. 
He served as Bishop of Comacchio until his death on 4 October 1648.

While bishop, he was the principal co-consecrator of Didier Palleti, (1644).

References

External links and additional sources
 (for Chronology of Bishops) 
 (for Chronology of Bishops) 

17th-century Italian Roman Catholic bishops
Bishops appointed by Pope Urban VIII
1648 deaths